Fürst (Fuerst) and Furst are surnames which may refer to:

 Alan Furst, Jewish American novelist
 Anton Furst, production designer
 Artur Fürst, German-Jewish writer
 Caleb Furst (born 2002), American college basketball player
 Chajim Fürst (1592–1653), Danish-German merchant
 Christiane Fürst (born 1985), German volleyball player
 Edmund Fürst (1874–1955), German-Israeli painter and illustrator
 Gebhard Fürst (born 1948), Bishop of Rottenburg-Stuttgart
 Georg Fürst (1870-1936), German composer
 Griff Furst (born 1981), actor and director
 János Fürst, Hungarian-Jewish conductor
 Joseph Furst, actor
 Julius Fürst (1805–1873), German-Jewish orientalist
 Moritz Fuerst (1782–1840), Jewish American artist
 Moses Israel Fürst (?–1692), German Jewish merchant
 Nathan Furst, composer
 Paula Fürst (1894–1944), German-Jewish educator and Zionist
 Rafe Furst  (born 1968) American entrepreneur and writer
 Stephen Furst (1954–2017), actor and director
 Steve Furst (born 1967), comedian and actor
 Walter Fürst (?–1317), Swiss patriot

German-language surnames
Jewish surnames